Joseph Dodds (1819–1891) was a British politician. He was elected as a Liberal Member of Parliament for Stockton-on-Tees in 1868.

Dodds was forced to resign in 1888, having been accused of embezzling funds from a client of his law firm. After his resignation, he became Steward of the Manor of Northstead.

Dodds had five children: Anne (1849), Matthew (1851), Joseph (1853), Elizabeth (1854), Frederick (1855) and Margaret (1858).

References

External links 

Liberal Party (UK) MPs for English constituencies
1819 births
1891 deaths
UK MPs 1868–1874
UK MPs 1874–1880
UK MPs 1880–1885
UK MPs 1885–1886
UK MPs 1886–1892